Chollinco Airport ,  is an airport serving Llifén, a lakeside village in the Los Ríos Region of Chile.

There is mountainous terrain north and south of the runway.

See also

Transport in Chile
List of airports in Chile

References

External links
OpenStreetMap - Chollinco
OurAirports - Chollinco
FallingRain - Chollinco Airport

Airports in Los Ríos Region